The 1997 Badminton Asia Cup; officially called as Sampoerna (King) Asia Cup 1997 was the 1st edition of the Badminton Asia Cup. It was held in Istora Senayan tennis indoor stadium, Jakarta, Indonesia from 19 February to 23 February with total prize money of 150,000 US Dollars. Tournament consisted of total of three matches in every team encounter, with format of Men's singles, Men's doubles and a second Men's singles match. Countries participated in this tournaments were Indonesia, Malaysia, India, Thailand, South Korea, Chinese Taipei, Hong Kong & Japan. Winning team & top seeded Indonesia got US$80,000 while runner-up Malaysian team got US$40,000. Third placed Chinese Taipei got a total of US$20,000 and 4th ranked South Korea bagged a total prize of US$10,000.

Group results

Group A 
1) Indonesia V/s India

2) Chinese Taipei V/s Thailand

3) Indonesia V/s Thailand

4) Chinese Taipei V/s India

5) Indonesia V/s Chinese Taipei

6) India V/s Thailand

Group B 
1) Malaysia V/s Hong Kong

2) South Korea vs Japan

3) Malaysia V/s Japan

4) South Korea vs Hong Kong

5) South Korea V/s Malaysia

6) Japan V/s Hong Kong

Semifinals 
1) Indonesia V/s South Korea

2) Chinese Taipei V/s Malaysia

Final 
Indonesia V/s Malaysia

Bronze medal tie 
Chinese Taipei V/s South Korea

References 

Badminton tournaments in Asia
1997 in badminton
1997 in Indonesian sport
Sports competitions in Jakarta
International sports competitions hosted by Indonesia